Rafiq or Rafique, meaning "intimate friend", "companion", and "comrade", is an Arabic masculine given name and surname also used in several other languages. Notable people with the name include:

Constituent of compound name
 Rafiqul Islam (disambiguation)
 Mohammad Rafiq (disambiguation), several people

Given name
 Rafiq Uddin Ahmed (1926–1952), demonstrator killed during Bengali Language Movement
 Rafiquddin Ahmad (1932–2013), chairman of Bangladesh Engineering and Shipbuilding Corporation
 Rafiq Azad (born 1943), Bengali poet
 Rafiq Bhatia (born 1987), American musician
 Rafiq Sabir (born 1950), Kurdish poet
 Rafiq Shahadah (born 1956), Syrian military officer
 Rafiq Tağı (1950–2011), Azerbaijani journalist
 Rafiq Zakaria (1920–2005), Indian politician

Surname
 Azeem Rafiq (born 1991), English cricketer
 Bilal Rafiq (born 1985), Pakistani footballer

Other
 Rafiq or companion, a title in the hierarchy of the Nizari Ismailis of Alamut period
  "Raj" is used as a common offshoot or nickname for the name Rafiq as a term of endearment

Arabic-language surnames
Arabic masculine given names